Germany participated in the Eurovision Song Contest 2015 with the song "Black Smoke", written by Michael Harwood, Ella McMahon and Tonino Speciale. The song was performed by Ann Sophie. The German entry for the 2015 contest in Vienna, Austria was selected through the national final Unser Song für Österreich, organised by the German broadcaster ARD in collaboration with Norddeutscher Rundfunk (NDR). The national final included a club concert wildcard round which took place on 19 February 2015 and featured ten undiscovered artists. Gaining 24.1% of the public vote, Ann Sophie was selected to compete in the final alongside seven established acts which took place on 5 March 2015 with the winner being selected through three rounds of public voting. "Heart of Stone" performed by Andreas Kümmert was initially announced as the German entry for Vienna after placing among the top four during the first round of voting, among the top two during the second round of voting and ultimately gaining 78.7% of the vote in the third round, however the artist immediately forfeited his victory upon the announcement. The confirmation of national final runner-up "Black Smoke" performed by Ann Sophie as the German entry occurred during the post-show press conference. The unprecedented withdrawal of Kümmert garnered international media interest.

As a member of the "Big Five", Germany automatically qualified to compete in the final of the Eurovision Song Contest. Performing in position 17, Germany placed twenty-seventh (last) out of the 27 participating countries and failed to score any points, making it the sixth time the nation had placed last in the history of the competition and the third time the nation received nul points.

Background 

Prior to the 2015 contest, Germany had participated in the Eurovision Song Contest fifty-eight times since its debut as one of seven countries to take part in 1956. Germany has won the contest on two occasions: in 1982 with the song "Ein bißchen Frieden" performed by Nicole and in 2010 with the song "Satellite" performed by Lena. Germany, to this point, has been noted for having competed in the contest more than any other country; they have competed in every contest since the first edition in 1956 except for the 1996 contest when the nation was eliminated in a pre-contest elimination round. In 2014, the German entry "Is It Right" performed by Elaiza placed eighteenth out of twenty-six competing songs scoring 39 points.

The German national broadcaster, ARD, broadcasts the event within Germany and delegates the selection of the nation's entry to the regional broadcaster Norddeutscher Rundfunk (NDR). NDR confirmed that Germany would participate in the 2015 Eurovision Song Contest on 23 May 2014. Since 2013, NDR had set up national finals with several artists to choose both the song and performer to compete at Eurovision for Germany. On 8 September 2014, the broadcaster announced that they would organise a multi-artist national final to select the German entry.

Before Eurovision

Unser Song für Österreich
Unser Song für Österreich (English: Our Song for Austria) was the competition that selected Germany's entry for the Eurovision Song Contest 2015. The competition took place on 5 March 2015 at the TUI Arena in Hannover, hosted by Barbara Schöneberger with Janin Reinhardt reporting from the green room. Like in the previous five years, the national final was co-produced by the production company Brainpool, which also co-produced the 2011 Eurovision Song Contest in Düsseldorf and the 2012 Eurovision Song Contest in Baku. Seven established acts and an eighth act selected through a wildcard round competed during the show with the winner being selected through a public televote. The show was broadcast on Das Erste and EinsFestival as well as online via the broadcaster's official website daserste.de and the broadcaster's Eurovision Song Contest website eurovision.de. The national final was watched by 3.2 million viewers in Germany.

Club Concert 
Interested artists were able to apply by submitting an online application and uploading a performance clip of either a cover song or an original song via YouTube between 8 September 2014 and 9 January 2015. Singer Andreas Bourani headed the campaign to encourage artists to apply. By the end of the process, it was announced that 1,213 candidates had applied for the wildcard round. The ten competing artists were selected by a nine-member panel consisting of Thomas Schreiber (ARD entertainment coordinator, head of the fiction and entertainment department for NDR), Steffen Müller (Warner Music Entertainment managing director for Central Europe), Konrad von Löhneysen (Embassy of Music managing director), Tom Bohne (Universal Music Senior Vice President), Aditya Sharma (Radio Fritz lead music editor), Nico Gössel (Sony Music head of promotion), Norbert Grundei (N-Joy program director), Jörg Grabosch (Brainpool managing director) and Claudia Gliedt (lead music editor for Brainpool).

The club concert took place on 19 February 2015 at the Große Freiheit 36 in Hamburg, hosted by Barbara Schöneberger with Janin Reinhardt reporting from the green room. The show was broadcast on NDR Fernsehen and EinsFestival as well as online via eurovision.de. The winner, Ann Sophie, was selected solely by public voting, including options for landline and SMS voting. In addition to the performances of the competing entries, German singer Mark Forster performed during the show. The concert show was watched by 520,000 viewers in Germany.

Competing entries 
Seven established acts were invited by NDR for the competition and were announced on 14 January 2015. The eighth participating act was selected through a club concert wildcard round on 19 February 2015.

Final

The televised final took place on 3 March 2015, which featured the seven established acts and Ann Sophie who won the wildcard round. The winner was selected through three rounds of public voting, including options for landline and SMS voting. In the first round, the eight artists performed their selected first of their two songs and the top four artists were selected to proceed to the second round. In the second round, the top four artists performed their second song and the top two entries, one song per artist, were selected to proceed to the third round. In the third round, the winner, "Heart of Stone" performed by Andreas Kümmert, was selected. However upon the announcement, Kümmert ceded his victory for runner-up Ann Sophie stating that he was not really in the right shape to represent Germany, and that Ann Sophie was much more qualified and suited. His unprecedented decision to withdraw later garnered international media attention. Following the show, NDR held a press conference confirming "Black Smoke" performed by Ann Sophie as the German entry for the 2015 Eurovision Song Contest. In addition to the performances of the competing entries, 2014 Eurovision winner Conchita Wurst performed her entry "Rise Like a Phoenix" and her new song "You Are Unstoppable", while Mark Forster performed his song "Flash mich" and Swiss singer Stefanie Heinzmann performed her new song "In the End".

At Eurovision 

According to Eurovision rules, all nations with the exceptions of the host country and the "Big Five" (France, Germany, Italy, Spain and the United Kingdom) are required to qualify from one of two semi-finals in order to compete for the final; the top ten countries from each semi-final progress to the final. In the 2015 contest, Australia also competed directly in the final as an invited guest nation. As a member of the "Big Five", Germany automatically qualified to compete in the final on 23 May 2015. In addition to their participation in the final, Germany was also required to broadcast and vote in one of the two semi-finals. During the semi-final allocation draw on 26 January 2015, Germany was assigned to broadcast and vote in the second semi-final on 21 May 2015.

In Germany, the semi-finals were broadcast on EinsFestival and Phoenix and the final was broadcast on Das Erste with commentary by Peter Urban. The German broadcaster also broadcast the three shows with sign language performers for the hearing impaired on EinsPlus. The German spokesperson, who announced the German votes during the final, was Barbara Schöneberger.

Final

Ann Sophie took part in technical rehearsals on 17 and 20 May, followed by dress rehearsals on 22 and 23 May. This included the jury final where professional juries of each country, responsible for 50 percent of each country's vote, watched and voted on the competing entries. After technical rehearsals were held on 20 May, the "Big 5" countries, host nation Austria and special guest Australia held a press conference. As part of this press conference, the artists took part in a draw to determine which half of the grand final they would subsequently participate in. Germany was drawn to compete in the second half. Following the conclusion of the second semi-final, the shows' producers decided upon the running order of the final. The running order for the semi-finals and final was decided by the shows' producers rather than through another draw, so that similar songs were not placed next to each other. Germany was subsequently placed to perform in position 17, following the entry from Montenegro and before the entry from Poland.

The stage show featured Ann Sophie dressed in a black jumpsuit, high heels and a single large gold earring with black feathers. Ann Sophie began the performance with her back turned to the audience and then performed a routine that included walking, gesturing and dancing. The stage lighting was black and white with yellow spotlights and smoke being displayed on the background LED screens. Another element of the performance were large stage prop lamps that emitted a yellow light. On stage, Ann Sophie was joined by four backing vocalists: Giovanna Winterfeldt, Bibi Vongehr, Lan Syreen and Kayna Okwuazu.

At the conclusion of the voting, Germany finished last in twenty-seventh place, the worst placement for a country in Eurovision history, failing to score any points. The nation initially tied with Austria as both countries finished with zero points, however, due to a tiebreaker rule that favours the song performed earliest in the running order, Germany was placed twenty-seventh, while Austria, which performed in position 14 during the final, placed twenty-sixth.

Voting
Voting during the three shows consisted of 50 percent public televoting and 50 percent from a jury deliberation. The jury consisted of five music industry professionals who were citizens of the country they represent, with their names published before the contest to ensure transparency. This jury was asked to judge each contestant based on: vocal capacity; the stage performance; the song's composition and originality; and the overall impression by the act. In addition, no member of a national jury could be related in any way to any of the competing acts in such a way that they cannot vote impartially and independently. The individual rankings of each jury member were released shortly after the grand final.

Following the release of the full split voting by the EBU after the conclusion of the competition, it was revealed that Germany had placed twenty-fifth with the public televote and twentieth with the jury vote. In the public vote, Germany scored 5 points and in the jury vote the nation scored 24 points.

Below is a breakdown of points awarded to Germany and awarded by Germany in the second semi-final and grand final of the contest, and the breakdown of the jury voting and televoting conducted during the two shows:

Points awarded to Germany
Germany did not receive any points at the 2015 Eurovision Song Contest.

Points awarded by Germany

Detailed voting results
The following members comprised the German jury:
 Johannes Strate (jury chairperson)bandleader, singer, songwriter
 Leslie Cliosinger, songwriter
 Mark Ćwiertnia (Mark Forster)singer, songwriter
 Sascha Reimann (Ferris MC)musician, rapper, actor
 music producer

References

External links 
Official NDR/ARD Eurovision site
Unser Song für Österreich official website

2015
Countries in the Eurovision Song Contest 2015
Eurovision
Eurovision